Cascade is a village in Sheboygan County, Wisconsin, United States. The population was 709 at the 2010 census. It is included in the Sheboygan, Wisconsin Metropolitan Statistical Area. Wisconsin Highway 28 passes through Cascade.

History
With the construction of two 100-kilowatt wind turbines in June 2010, Cascade became the first community in Wisconsin to use locally produced wind energy to power its municipal wastewater treatment plant.

Geography
Cascade is located at  (43.658541, -88.008412).

Demographics

2010 census
As of the census of 2010, there were 709 people, 274 households, and 206 families living in the village. The racial makeup of the village was 97.7% White, 0.4% African American, 0.3% Native American, 0.4% Pacific Islander, 0.7% from other races, and 0.4% from two or more races. Hispanic or Latino of any race were 3.8% of the population.

There were 274 households, of which 35.8% had children under the age of 18 living with them, 58.0% were married couples living together, 9.9% had a female householder with no husband present, 7.3% had a male householder with no wife present, and 24.8% were non-families. 20.1% of all households were made up of individuals, and 9.5% had someone living alone who was 65 years of age or older. The average household size was 2.59 and the average family size was 2.93.

The median age in the village was 39.2 years. 24.8% of residents were under the age of 18; 7.4% were between the ages of 18 and 24; 25.5% were from 25 to 44; 30.8% were from 45 to 64; and 11.3% were 65 years of age or older. The gender makeup of the village was 51.9% male and 48.1% female.

2000 census
As of the census of 2000, there were 666 people, 255 households, and 190 families living in the village. The population density was 895.8 people per square mile (347.5/km2). There were 269 housing units at an average density of 361.8 per square mile (140.4/km2). The racial makeup of the village was 98.80% White, 0.15% African American, 0.90% Native American, and 0.15% from two or more races. Hispanic or Latino of any race were 1.65% of the population.

There were 255 households, out of which 34.9% had children under the age of 18 living with them, 65.9% were married couples living together, 6.7% had a female householder with no husband present, and 25.1% were non-families. 22.4% of all households were made up of individuals, and 9.4% had someone living alone who was 65 years of age or older. The average household size was 2.61 and the average family size was 3.06.

In the village, the population was spread out, with 25.8% under the age of 18, 7.2% from 18 to 24, 30.9% from 25 to 44, 21.6% from 45 to 64, and 14.4% who were 65 years of age or older. The median age was 37 years. For every 100 females, there were 102.4 males. For every 100 females age 18 and over, there were 94.5 males.

The median income for a household in the village was $47,232, and the median income for a family was $52,500. Males had a median income of $38,214 versus $25,139 for females. The per capita income for the village was $20,617. About 4.3% of families and 6.6% of the population were below the poverty line, including 15.2% of those under age 18 and none of those age 65 or over.

Notable people
George H. Brickner, politician and businessman
Cadwallader Humphrey, politician
Daniel LeMahieu, politician

Images

References

External links 
 Village of Cascade information from Sheboygan County website

Villages in Sheboygan County, Wisconsin
Villages in Wisconsin